Chełmno Landscape Park (Chełmiński Park Krajobrazowy) is a protected area (Landscape Park) in north-central Poland, established in 1998, covering an area of .

The Park lies within Kuyavian-Pomeranian Voivodeship, in the region of the town of Chełmno, stretching along the right bank of the Vistula river. It forms a complex with the Vistula Landscape Park on the opposite bank. From 1999 to 2003 these areas constituted a single Landscape Park, called the Lower Vistula Valley Landscape Park (Park Krajobrazowy Doliny Dolnej Wisły). The two parks have a common administration located in Świecie.

Landscape parks in Poland
Parks in Kuyavian-Pomeranian Voivodeship
Chełmno County